A master sergeant is the military rank for a senior non-commissioned officer in the armed forces of some countries.

Israel Defense Forces 
The   (abbreviated "", master sergeant) is a non-commissioned officer rank in the Israel Defense Forces (IDF). Because the IDF is an integrated force, they have a unique rank structure. IDF ranks are the same in all services (army, navy and air force). This origin is reflected in the slightly-compacted IDF rank structure.

Philippines 
Master sergeant is used by the Armed Forces of the Philippines as a non-commissioned officer rank. It is used by the Philippine Army, Philippine Air Force and the Philippine Marine Corps (under the Philippine Navy. The rank is below Senior master sergeant and above Technical sergeant.

As of February 8, 2019, a new ranking classification for the Philippine National Police was adopted, eliminating confusion of old ranks. Master sergeant is one of the new classification for non-commissioned officer rank. The rank stands above the Police Staff sergeant and below the Police Senior master sergeant.

Singapore

Singapore Armed Forces 
In the Singapore Armed Forces (SAF), master sergeant is the highest rank amongst the specialist corps, ranking above staff sergeant and below third warrant officer. In the Singapore Army, master sergeants are usually instructors, staff specialists, or sergeants major of battalion or company-sized units. They are addressed as "master" or "master sergeant".

National Cadet Corps 
In the National Cadet Corps (NCC), the rank of master sergeant is awarded to outstanding NCC cadets who have contributed greatly to their unit. The insignia of MSG (NCC) is the same as the SAF's, except that the letters 'NCC' are below the insignia, to differentiate SAF and NCC master sergeants.

United States 

Master sergeant is a senior non-commissioned officer rank used within the United States Armed Forces by the United States Army, Marine Corps, Air Force, and Space Force. It is ranked differently depending on the service branch. The Civil Air Patrol also has the rank of master sergeant.

U.S. Army 

Master sergeant (MSG) is the eighth enlisted grade (E-8), ranking above sergeant first class and below sergeant major, command sergeant major, Sergeant Major of the Army, and equal in grade but not authority to a first sergeant. It is abbreviated as MSG and indicated by three chevrons above three inverted arcs, commonly referred to as "rockers".

A master sergeant may be assigned as a brigade-level section noncommissioned officer in charge and serves as the subject matter expert in their field, but may also hold other positions depending on the type of unit. The equivalent-grade first sergeant is the senior noncommissioned officer of a company, battery, or troop.

When holding the position of first sergeant, while uncommon, the master sergeant is referred to as "first sergeant"; however, when not in the position of first sergeant, master sergeants are addressed as "sergeant". This is the standard address for all pay grades E-5 through E-8. Use of the term "top" or "master sergeant" is not a requirement, but is considered courteous, and remains to be at the discretion of the one addressing the master sergeant, though "top" is preferred, due to the long tradition of its use in the U.S. Army, which has, since the Civil War, emphasized the importance of senior NCOs closely advising and instructing newly-commissioned second lieutenants, first lieutenants and captains.

In 1920, the Army combined several regimental level "staff" NCO ranks, including four grades of sergeant major, three grades of quartermaster sergeant, regimental supply sergeant, senior ordnance sergeant, senior band sergeant, four grades of senior master sergeant, and seven additional master-level technical and specialist ranks into the new master sergeant rank. Master sergeant then became the senior enlisted rank, ranking above technical sergeant and first sergeant (a positional rank/title for the senior technical sergeant in a company/battery/troop), while "sergeant major" became a "courtesy title" for the senior master sergeant in a battalion/squadron or higher headquarters.

In 1942, the rank of first sergeant was elevated one grade and was then considered as a junior version of master sergeant, because while first sergeants served as senior NCOs at the company/battery/troop level, master sergeants held positions as the senior NCO in their MOS at battalion/squadron and higher level headquarters. In 1958, both first sergeant and master sergeant were elevated one grade to the new E-8 pay grade, while the rank of sergeant major was restored as the senior enlisted rank at the new pay grade of E-9.

U.S. Marine Corps 

The eighth enlisted grade, ranking above gunnery sergeant and below master gunnery sergeant, sergeant major, and Sergeant Major of the Marine Corps. It is equal in grade to first sergeant, and is abbreviated MSgt In the U.S. Marine Corps, master sergeants provide technical leadership as occupational specialists at the E-8 level.

Most infantry master sergeants serve as the operations chief of a weapons company, in place of the gunnery sergeant found in the company headquarters of a rifle company. Infantry master sergeants also serve as the assistant operations chief in the S-3 section of the headquarters of an infantry regiment and Marine Expeditionary Unit and in the G-3 section of the headquarters of a Marine Expeditionary Brigade. The Marine division and Marine Expeditionary Force headquarters contains two infantry master sergeants, one as the training SNCO and the other as the readiness chief.

Some combat support battalions have master sergeants at the company level (e.g., one as the tank leader, again replacing the company gunnery sergeant, in the operations section of the tank company headquarters, and two in the company headquarters of an assault amphibian company, one master sergeant as the company gunnery sergeant in the headquarters section and the other as the section leader of the company headquarters AMTRAC Section).

In Marine aircraft squadrons MSgts usually serve as SNCOICs of the ordnance and avionics divisions in the aircraft maintenance department. The Aircraft Maintenance Chief/SNCOIC is usually a MGySgt (q.v.), and there are eight aviation-related MSgt billets in each Marine Aviation Logistics Squadron (MALS). (A MALs is organic to each Marine Aircraft Group (MAG) and performs intermediate aviation supply, aircraft maintenance (including aviation life support equipment and avionics), and aviation ordnance support for its supported aircraft squadrons.)

Most non-infantry master sergeants serve as section chief/SNCOIC of their MOS type staff section in a battalion or higher level headquarters. General command leadership at this paygrade is provided by the separate rank of first sergeant.

Only in the Marine Corps are master sergeants required to be addressed by their full rank. In the Marine Corps, master sergeants may be referred to by the nickname of "Top". This usage is an informal one, however, and would not be used in an official or formal setting. Use of this nickname by Marines of subordinate rank is at the rank holder's discretion. In the U.S. Armed Forces, all master sergeants (Army, Air Force, and Marine Corps) are senior non-commissioned officers (i.e., pay grades E-7 through E-9). However, in the U.S. Marine Corps, the non-commissioned officer ranks of staff sergeant and above, are classified as Staff Non-Commissioned Officers (SNCOs), a classification that is unique in U.S. usage to the USMC.

U.S. Air Force 

The seventh enlisted grade, ranking above technical sergeant and below senior master sergeant. It is abbreviated as MSgt. Advancement to master sergeant is one of the most significant promotions within the enlisted Air Force and Space Force. At the rank of master sergeant, the airman enters the senior non-commissioned tier and transitions his or her duties from front line technicians and supervisors to operational leaders. An operational leader develops his or her leadership and management skills since this rank carries increased broad leadership, supervisory, and managerial responsibilities rather than technical performance.

Per Air Force Instruction 36–2618, master sergeants do serve in positions as squadron superintendents, flight chiefs, section chiefs, and non-commissioned Officer in Charge (NCOIC). Master sergeants are the lowest pay grade in the Air Force and Space Force at which one can hold the special duty position and responsibilities of a first sergeant. Air Force first sergeants occupy the pay grades of E-7 through E-9 and are referred to officially as "first sergeant" regardless of pay grade, and unofficially as "first shirt" or "shirt".

In 1991, the Air Force changed its NCO insignia so that a maximum of five stripes, or rockers, were placed on the bottom of the chevrons. The master sergeant rank insignia was changed by removing the bottom (sixth) rocker, and relocating it above as a single chevron, on top of the five lower stripes.  The single chevron above visually identifies Senior NCO status for E-7 master sergeants along with two chevrons above for E-8 senior master sergeants and three chevrons above for E-9 chief master sergeants in the Air Force NCO insignia. In 2015, the Air Force announced its promotion overhaul and newly established boards for master sergeant.

Civil Air Patrol 

The Civil Air Patrol (CAP), a non-profit corporation Congressionally chartered to operate as the civilian auxiliary of the U.S. Air Force, has a quasi-military structure which includes the rank of master sergeant. The grade of master sergeant is below senior master sergeant and above technical sergeant. Former military enlisted personnel who held the rank of master sergeant in the United States Armed Forces may retain that rank as members of the CAP.

U.S. Space Force 
On February 1, 2021, the United States Space Force announced its permanent rank structure, establishing the grade of master sergeant as its permanent E-7 grade. This continued its usage from the Air Force. The grade of master sergeant is above technical sergeant and beneath senior master sergeant.

Gallery

See also 
 Comparative military ranks
 United States military pay

References

External links 
 U.S. Army Enlisted Rank Insignia - Criteria, Background, and Images
 The Master Sergeant Watershed - A Practical Guide for Supervisors of the Air Force's Critical Stripe

Enlisted ranks of the United States Air Force
Enlisted ranks of the United States Space Force
Military ranks of Singapore
Military ranks of the United States Army
Military ranks of the United States Marine Corps
United States military enlisted ranks